Kosivska is a river in Zakarpattia Oblast of Ukraine. Right tributary of Tisza. It flows into the Tisza at the border with Romania, near the village Lunca la Tisa.

Sources
 Географічна енциклопедія України: в 3-х томах / Редколегія: О. М. Маринич (відпов. ред.) та ін. — К.: «Українська радянська енциклопедія» імені М. П. Бажана, 1989.

Rivers of Zakarpattia Oblast